Lauren Vedder Ackerman (March 12, 1905 – July 27, 1993) was an American physician and pathologist, who championed the subspecialty of surgical pathology in the mid-20th century.

Early life 
Ackerman was born in March 1905 in Auburn, New York, to Bertha (née Vedder) and John Ackerman. Both of his parents were college graduates. His father was a civil and mechanical engineer, who later became city manager of Watertown, New York. Despite growing up in a learned family environment, Lauren was an indifferent student with mediocre grades. After high school graduation in 1923 Ackerman began his college studies at St. Lawrence University (Canton, New York), later transferring to, and graduating from, Hamilton College (Clinton, New York) in 1927 with a B.S. degree in engineering. He worked for the next year in that profession, but then decided to pursue a medical career.

Education 
Lauren was accepted to the University of Rochester School of Medicine (Rochester, New York), then a new facility. Its faculty provided virtually individual attention to the students, a practice that Ackerman was to adopt himself in the future. After obtaining his M.D. in 1932, he served as an intern and resident in internal medicine at the University of California-San Francisco (UCSF) under the chairmanship of William Kerr. A year's sabbatical from training was necessary because Ackerman had contracted tuberculosis as a medical student. As a patient in a local sanitarium, he helped to pass the time by assisting at autopsies performed on less fortunate cohorts.

After completion of his medicine residency, Lauren pursued specialty training in pathology. He returned to the University of Rochester, where he worked under the direction of George Whipple. After a year, Ackerman moved to Boston, Massachusetts as a resident working principally at the Pondville State Cancer Hospital. He completed his studies there in 1938, and married Elizabeth Fitts the same year.

Career 
With no available pathology positions in the offing, Ackerman accepted a position as assistant professor of medicine back at UCSF in 1939. There he was responsible for performing autopsies on patients who had died of pulmonary diseases. In 1940, a job in pathology was offered to Ackerman at the Ellis Fischel Cancer Hospital (EFCH) in Columbia, Missouri, a state-run center for indigent patients with malignancies. Because of his background in clinical medicine, he also had duties in electrocardiography and radiotherapy. After several years of experience there, Ackerman authored his first book, Cancer: Diagnosis, Treatment, and Prognosis, with Juan Del Regato, a radiotherapist. A progressively closer professional relationship grew with surgeons at nearby Barnes Hospital and Washington University in St. Louis, several of whom also had appointments at EFCH. In 1948, Ackerman was offered a position at Barnes Hospital as the chief surgical pathologist and associate professor of surgery, under the chairmanship of Evarts Ambrose Graham (it was then a common practice for surgical pathologists to be part of surgery faculties).

Ackerman accrued experience in diagnostic surgical pathology over the succeeding several years. In the early 1950s, he decided to apply that knowledge to the formulation of a textbook, which was and published in 1953 with the title Surgical Pathology. Although other texts on the topic did exist—notably one by Dr. William Boyd—Ackerman's monograph focused on differential diagnosis and the clinical significance of morphologic findings. Accordingly, it rapidly drew attention and acclaim from other practicing pathologists.

Ackerman wrote peer-reviewed publications about surgical pathological subjects throughout the early and mid-1950s. As a consequence, he received and accepted many invitations to present seminars around the world.  During those travels, Ackerman was introduced to the best young pathologists that many countries had to offer, and several such individuals were invited to St. Louis to further their training with him. American physicians wishing to become surgical pathologists were also increasingly drawn to Barnes Hospital. A steady stream of Ackerman-trained surgical pathology fellows emerged during the next 20 years, many of whom went on to become renowned practitioners and educators. The Ackerman "method" involved thorough morphologic analysis, correlation of pathologic findings with detailed clinical information, and active consultation with attending physicians to assure optimal patient care.

After a 25-year tenure, Ackerman retired as a professor at the Washington University School of Medicine in 1973.

Post-retirement 
Ackerman moved back to New York state with his wife, and took an adjunct faculty position at the State University of New York at Stony Brook (SUNY-SB).   He continued to lecture actively at an international level, but he assigned editorship of his surgical pathology textbook to Juan Rosai, who continued to oversee Rosai & Ackerman's Surgical Pathology through its 10th edition.

Recognition 
Ackerman received the Janeway Medal of the American Radium Society; the Fred W. Stewart Award from Memorial Sloan-Kettering Cancer Center of New York City; the Gold-Headed Cane Award from the American Association of Pathologists; the Distinguished Service Award from Washington University; the Prix de Paris Award from the Institute Gustave-Roussy in Villejuif, France; and the City of Paris Award from Paris, France.

Personal life 
Ackerman was a skilled pool player; an avid fisherman and golfer; a lover of art, literature, and classical music; and a connoisseur of fine food and wine. He had three daughters and a son and 13 grandchildren. His first wife, Elizabeth, died of complications of plasmacytic myeloma in 1981. Late in life, Ackerman married Carol Blum, a professor of French and Italian at SUNY-SB.

Death 
In mid-1993, Ackerman developed abdominal complaints and was found to have peritoneal carcinomatosis from a colonic cancer. He died on July 27 of that year.

See also
 Juan Rosai
 Pathology
 List of pathologists

References 

20th-century American physicians
20th-century American women physicians
American pathologists
1905 births
1993 deaths
Physicians from New York (state)
University of Rochester alumni
20th-century American male writers
Washington University School of Medicine faculty
Hamilton College (New York) alumni